Ignacia del Espíritu Santo luco, also known as Mother Ignacia (February 1, 1663 – September 10, 1748) was a Filipino religious sister of the Catholic Church. She was known for her acts of piety and religious poverty and founded the Congregation of the Sisters of the Religious of the Virgin Mary, the first native Filipino female congregation with approved pontifical status in what is now the Republic of the Philippines.

Mother Ignacia del Espíritu Santo was declared Venerable by Pope Benedict XVI on July 6, 2007.

Early life
Ignacia was the eldest and sole surviving child of María Jerónima, a Filipina, and José Yuco, a Christian Chinese migrant from Xiamen, China. Her birthdate of is piously celebrated as February 1, 1663, based on the cultural customs of the Spanish Era. Only her baptismal record is preserved, which occurred on March 4, 1663. Ignacia was christened in the long-gone Church of the Holy Kings in the fifth Parián de Chinos by Fray Padre Alberto Collares, O.P.

Expected by her parents to marry at 21 years old, Ignacia sought religious counsel from Father Pablo Clain, a Jesuit priest from the Kingdom of Bohemia (present-day Czech Republic). The priest directed her through the Spiritual Exercises of Saint Ignatius of Loyola, from which Ignacia drew her apostolic devotion and piety. After this period of solitude and prayer, Ignacia decided to pursue her religious calling, to "remain in the service of the Divine Majesty” and “live by the sweat of her brow.” According to Father Murillo Velarde, her eyewitness biographer, Ignacia left her parents' home with only a needle and a pair of scissors.

Religious seclusion
At that time, there were only two religious houses for women in the Philippines: the Beatero de Santo Domingo and Santa Clara Monastery, and they only permitted to admit those of pure Spanish ancestry. Ignacia felt strongly against the Spanish law that prohibited native Filipinos from entering priestly or religious life. The Spanish Mother Jerónima de la Asunción opened the first convent in the Philippines in 1621 but Filipinas could not be admitted. In hopes of changing this racially structured ecclesiastical limitation, Ignacia began to live alone in a vacant house at the back of the Colegio Jesuita de Manila, the Jesuit headquarters. Spiritually assisted by Jesuit Father Pablo Clain she led a life of public prayer and labor which attracted other Filipino laywomen to live with her. She accepted them into her company and, though they were not officially recognized as a religious institute at the time, together they became known as the Beatas de la Virgen María (English: "Religious of the Virgin Mary") living at the Beatería de la Compañía de Jesús (English: "Convent of the Society of Jesus").  For their chapel they used the old San Ignacio Church (destroyed in the Second World War) and the Jesuit priests were their spiritual directors.

Established in 1684, they were the first Filipino religious congregation for women in the Philippines. Popular folk tales describe a  penitential form of spirituality and mortification of the flesh which sustained these women in hardship, especially during times of extreme poverty when they had to beg for rice and salt and scour Manila's streets for firewood. They supported themselves through manual labor and alms received. The Beatas only admitted young girls and boarders who were taught catechism and given manual work. Eventually, their growing number called for a more stable lifestyle and a set of rules or religious constitutions to govern their daily schedule.

Constitution of her order
After about 42 years from her taking up the life of a religious, in 1726, Ignacia wrote a set of rules for her religious group, finalised constitutions for a congregation, and submitted this to the Archdiocesan Chancery Office of Manila for ecclesiastical approbation, which the Fiscal Provisor of Manila formally granted in 1732, along with the rules in use among other religious women. Ignacia, now  69 years old, decided to resign as mother superior of the order, and lived as an ordinary member until her death at 85 on September 10, 1748. She died after receiving Holy Communion at the altar rail of the old Jesuit Church of San Ignacio in Intramuros.

After her death in 1748, the Archbishop of Manila Reverend Pedro de la Santísima Trinidad Martínez de Arizala, O.F.M., paid homage to the growing religious group of his archdiocese in his writings. He wrote:

In May 1768, the Royal Decree of King Charles III of Spain on the Suppression of the Jesuits reached Manila. It was later implemented with the approval of Pope Clement XIV, which was a blow to Ignacia's group as the Jesuit priests were expelled from the Philippines and deported to Spain and Italy. But her group carried on.

Pontifical approval 
On July 31, 1906, the American Archbishop of Manila Jeremiah James Harty assisted the religious sisters in the canonical erection of Mother Ignacia's congregation, which was previously postponed in the filing of 1732 due to an incorrect process of petitioning to Rome. On March 17, 1907, Pope Pius X promulgated the Decretum Laudis (English: Decree of Praise) in favour of the congregation's Rules and Constitutions. The Decree of Approbation was granted by Pope Pius XI on March 24, 1931, which made it a Congregation of Pontifical right. On January 12, 1948 (the 200th anniversary of the death of Mother Ignacia del Espíritu Santo), Pope Pius XII issued the Decree of Definitive Papal Approbation of the Constitutions.

As venerable
In a papal decree dated July 6, 2007, Pope Benedict XVI accepted the findings of the prefect of the Congregation for the Causes of Saints and declared that 

On February 1, 2008, Archbishop of Manila Cardinal Gaudencio Rosales presided over the promulgation which officially accorded Ignacia the title "venerable" at the Minor Basilica of San Lorenzo Ruiz in Binondo, Manila.

Legacy

Mother Ignacia Avenue in the Dilimán district of Quezon City is named after Mother Ignacia del Espíritu Santo and is the address of both St. Mary's College, Quezon City (a private school belonging to her Religious of the Virgin Mary – RVM), and the ABS-CBN Broadcasting Center and ELJ Communications Center serving as the headquarters of the Philippine media conglomerate ABS-CBN Corporation and its divisions and subsidiaries, and the television network of the same name.

The municipality of Santa Ignacia in Tarlac is also named in honour of Mother Ignacia del Espíritu Santo.

References

External links
Saint Mary's Academy
Official Website

1663 births
1748 deaths
18th-century venerated Christians
Leaders of Catholic female orders and societies
Filipino people of Chinese descent
17th-century Filipino Roman Catholic nuns
Religious of the Virgin Mary
Notre Dame Educational Association
People from Binondo
Venerated Catholics by Pope Benedict XVI
18th-century Filipino Roman Catholic nuns